This article lists important figures and events in Malayan public affairs during the year 1948, together with births and deaths of significant Malayans. Malaya left the British colonial Malayan Union; the Federation of Malaya took place on 1 February.

Incumbent political figures

Central level
 Governor of Malaya :
 Edward Gent – (until 4 July)
 Henry Gurney – (from 1 October)
 Chief Minister Federation of Malaya :
 Tunku Abdul Rahman Putra Al-Haj (from 1 February)

State level
  Perlis :
 Raja of Perlis : Syed Harun Putra Jamalullail 
 Menteri Besar of Perlis : Raja Ahmad Raja Endut (from 1 February)
  Johore :
 Sultan of Johor : Sultan Ibrahim Al-Masyhur
 Menteri Besar of Johore : Onn Jaafar
  Kedah :
 Sultan of Kedah : Sultan Badlishah
 Menteri Besar of Kedah : Mohamad Sheriff Osman (from 1 February)
  Kelantan :
 Sultan of Kelantan : Sultan Ibrahim
 Menteri Besar of Kelantan : Nik Ahmad Kamil Nik Mahmud 
  Terengganu :
 Sultan of Terengganu : Sultan Ismail Nasiruddin Shah
 Menteri Besar of Trengganu : Tengku Mohamad Sultan Ahmad
  Selangor :
 Sultan of Selangor : Sultan Sir Hishamuddin Alam Shah Al-Haj 
 Menteri Besar of Selangor : Hamzah Abdullah
  Penang :
 Monarchs : King George VI
 Residents-Commissioner :
 Sydney Noel King (until unknown date)
 Arthur Vincent Aston (from unknown date)
  Malacca :
 Monarchs : King George VI
 Residents-Commissioner : John Falconer
  Negri Sembilan :
 Yang di-Pertuan Besar of Negri Sembilan : Tuanku Abdul Rahman ibni Almarhum Tuanku Muhammad 
 Menteri Besar Negri Sembilan : Abdul Malek Yusuf (from 1 February)
  Pahang :
 Sultan of Pahang : Sultan Abu Bakar
 Menteri Besar of Pahang : Mahmud Mat (from 1 February)
  Perak :
 British Adviser of Perak : 
 Arthur Vincent Aston (until unknown date)
 James Innes Miller (from unknown date)
 Sultan of Perak :
 Sultan Abdul Aziz Al-Mutasim Billah Shah Ibni Almarhum Raja Muda Musa I (until 27 March)
 Sultan Yusuf Izzuddin Shah (from 27 March)
 Menteri Besar of Perak : Abdul Wahab Toh Muda Abdul Aziz (from 1 February)

Events
 Early 1948 – The British government banned Angkatan Wanita Sedar (AWAS), together with several other political parties like PKMM and Hisbul Muslimin, accusing them of having connections to the Malayan Communist Party.
1 February – The Federation of Malaya was established, replacing the Malayan Union.
18 February – Keeper of the Rulers' Seal was established.
16 June – Three European estate managers were murdered at Sg. Siput, Perak, which led to the events on 19 June.
19 June – A state of emergency was declared in Malaya following Communist rebellions.
16 July – Leading Communist Party of Malaya (CPM) member Lau Yew was killed.
1 August – General Operations Force was founded as Jungle Squad.
6 October – Sir Henry Gurney was appointed High Commissioner of Malaya.
12 December – 25 civilians were killed by British soldiers at Batang Kali, Selangor.
December – Kachau Village in Selangor was torched by the British to smoke out Communist guerillas.
 Unknown date – The Federal Legislative Council (Malaya) was established as the legislative body of the Federation of Malaya (predecessor of the Malaysian Parliament).
 Unknown date – The Malayan National Liberation Army was founded (dissolved in 1989).
 Unknown date – The Malaysian Red Crescent was founded as branches of the British Red Cross Society.
 Unknown date – The Melaka Warrior Monument was completed and unveiled.
 Unknown date – The Sedition Act 1948 was enacted.
 Unknown date – The Interpretation Acts 1948 was enacted.
 Unknown date – Federated Malay States Railways (FMSR) was dissolved and replaced by Malayan Railways.
 Unknown date – All-Malaya Council of Joint Action (AMCJA) was dissolved.

Births 
 14 January – Tuanku Muhriz ibni Almarhum Tuanku Munawir – 11th Yang di-Pertuan Besar Negeri Sembilan 
 17 January – Tajuddin Abdul Rahman – Politician
 1 February – Mohd Effendi Norwawi – Politician
 29 February – Khalid Salleh – Actor (died 2018)
 23 June – Zakri Abdul Hamid – Scientist and academician
 25 July – Rafeah Buang – Singer (died 2002)
 28 August – Shaharuddin Abdullah – Footballer
 19 December – Norlia Ghani – Actress

Deaths
 16 July – Lau Yew – Member of the Malayan Communist Party

See also 
 1948
 1947 in Malaya | 1949 in Malaya
 History of Malaysia

 
Years of the 20th century in Malaysia
Malaya
Malaya
Malaya